Randy Tribble is an American football coach. He was the head football coach at Harding University in Searcy, Arkansas from 1994 to 2007, compiling a record of 73–63–1. He was an assistant coach at Harding for 13 years before becoming head coach. 

A former all-conference defensive back at Harding under coach John Prock in the 1970s, Tribble was inducted into the Harding Athletics Hall of Fame in 1999.

Head coaching record

College

Notes

References

Year of birth missing (living people)
Living people
American football defensive backs
Harding Bisons football coaches
Harding Bisons football players
High school football coaches in Arkansas
High school football coaches in Texas